The Ethiopian swallow (Hirundo aethiopica) is a species of bird in the family Hirundinidae.  Although it is non-migratory, its range is wide, extending from Benin to Burkina Faso, Cameroon, Central African Republic, Chad, Democratic Republic of the Congo, Ivory Coast, Eritrea, Ethiopia, Ghana, Guinea, Israel, Kenya, Mali, Niger, Nigeria, Senegal, Somalia, Sudan, Tanzania, Togo, Uganda.

References

Ethiopian swallow
Birds of Sub-Saharan Africa
Birds of the Horn of Africa
Fauna of Ethiopia
Ethiopian swallow
Taxonomy articles created by Polbot